Marie Lu (born 11 July 1984; birthname: Xiwei Lu, Chinese: 陸希未) is a Chinese-American young adult author. She is best known for the Legend series, novels set in a dystopian and militarized future, as well as the Young Elites series, the Warcross series, and Batman: Nightwalker in the DC Icons series.

Early life
Lu was born in 1984 in Wuxi, Jiangsu, China, and later moved to Beijing. In 1989, she and her family moved to the United States in Texas when she was five years old, during the Tiananmen Square Protest. She attended the University of Southern California and interned at Disney Interactive Studios.

Lu lives in Los Angeles, California with her husband, their son (born 2019) and three dogs.

Career
Lu's debut novel, Legend, was published November 29, 2011 as the first of a young adult science fiction trilogy. Lu has said that she was inspired by the movie Les Miserables and sought to recreate the conflict between Valjean and Javert in a teenage version. Two other books in the planned trilogy, Prodigy and Champion, were published in 2013.

Lu's first fantasy series began with publication of The Young Elites on October 7, 2014. It was followed by The Rose Society on October 13, 2015, and The Midnight Star on October 16, 2016.

Works

Legend series 
 Legend (November 29, 2011)
 Prodigy (January 8, 2013)
 Champion (November 5, 2013)
 Life Before Legend (Novella #0.5) (January 5, 2013)
 Life After Legend (Novella #3.5) (2017)
 Life After Legend II (Novella #3.6) (2018)
 Rebel (October 1, 2019)

The Young Elites series 
 The Young Elites (October 7, 2014)
 The Rose Society (October 13, 2015)
 The Midnight Star (October 16, 2016)

Warcross series 
 Warcross (September 12, 2017)
 Wildcard (September 18, 2018)

Skyhunter series 
 Skyhunter (September 29, 2020)
Steelstriker (September 28, 2021)

DC Icons series 
 Batman: Nightwalker (DC Icons, Book 2) (January 2, 2018)

Spirit Animals series 
 The Evertree (Spirit Animals, Book 7) (March 31, 2015)

Standalone novels 
 The Kingdom of Back (March 3, 2020)

Short Stories 
 "The Journey" in A Tyranny of Petticoats, edited by Jessica Spotswood (March 8, 2017)

References

External links

 Author's Website
 Ridley Pearson in The New York Times Book Review on Legend
 The Los Angeles Times on Prodigy
 

1984 births
Living people
Writers from Wuxi
21st-century American novelists
American young adult novelists
American women novelists
Women writers of young adult literature
American writers of Chinese descent
University of Southern California alumni
Writers of young adult science fiction
Chinese emigrants to the United States
21st-century American women writers